Southwark was a constituency centred on the Southwark district of South London. It returned two Members of Parliament to the House of Commons of the English Parliament from 1295 to 1707, to the Parliament of Great Britain from 1707 to 1800, and to the UK Parliament until its first abolition for the 1885 general election.  A seat of the same name, covering a smaller area than the last form of the earlier seat in the west of the original and beyond its boundaries to the southwest, was created in 1950 and abolished in 1974.

In its last creation the seat's broad electorate heavily supported the three successive Labour candidates, who won Southwark with a majority of greater than 36% of the votes cast at its eight elections – an extremely safe seat.

Creation, boundaries, abolition
First creation – or Southwark dual-member constituency 
The constituency was created in 1295 as a parliamentary borough (also known as burgh) when its electorate was restricted to the owners of certain properties in its main streets of its burgage, returning two 'burgesses' as they were sometimes called. Its electorate was expanded to a more standard franchise in 1832.  In 1833 the electorate was 4,775 adult males and this had risen to 23,472 by 1880.

The Redistribution of Seats Act 1885 replaced the two-member constituency with the seats West Southwark, Rotherhithe and Bermondsey.

Second creation – or Southwark seat
A seat taking the old constituency name was established for the 1950 general election.  Its boundaries were unaltered in the 1955 corrective review and it was abolished for the February 1974 general election.

Members of Parliament

MPs 1295–1640

MPs 1640–1885

MPs 1950–1974

Election results

Elections in the 1830s

 

Harris' death caused a by-election.

 

 
 

 
 

Harvey was appointed a registrar of Metropolitan Public Carriages, causing a by-election.

Elections in the 1840s
Harvey resigned after being appointed a Commissioner of Police for the City of London, causing a by-election.

 

 

Wood's death caused a by-election.

Elections in the 1850s

 

Molesworth was appointed First Commissioner of Works and Public Buildings, requiring a by-election.

Molesworth was appointed Secretary of State for the Colonies, requiring a by-election.

Molesworth's death caused a by-election.

Elections in the 1860s
Napier's death caused a by-election.

 

Locke was appointed Recorder of Brighton, requiring a by-election.

 
 
 

Layard was appointed First Commissioner of Works and Public Buildings, requiring a by-election.

Elections in the 1870s
Layard resigned after being appointed British ambassador to Spain.

Elections in the 1880s
Locke's death caused a by-election.

Elections in the 1950s

Elections in the 1960s

Elections in the 1970s

References

Sources
Robert Beatson, A Chronological Register of Both Houses of Parliament (London: Longman, Hurst, Res & Orme, 1807) A Chronological Register of Both Houses of the British Parliament, from the Union in 1708, to the Third Parliament of the United Kingdom of Great Britain and Ireland, in 1807
D Brunton & D H Pennington, Members of the Long Parliament (London: George Allen & Unwin, 1954)
Cobbett's Parliamentary history of England, from the Norman Conquest in 1066 to the year 1803 (London: Thomas Hansard, 1808) Digital Bodleian
F W S Craig, British Parliamentary Election Results 1832–1885 (2nd edition, Aldershot: Parliamentary Research Services, 1989)

Parliamentary constituencies in London (historic)
Constituencies of the Parliament of the United Kingdom established in 1295
Constituencies of the Parliament of the United Kingdom disestablished in 1885
Constituencies of the Parliament of the United Kingdom established in 1950
Constituencies of the Parliament of the United Kingdom disestablished in 1974
Politics of the London Borough of Southwark